KMS Tools & Equipment is an industrial distributor that carries a huge selection of tools, from high quality to heavy-duty professional tools to value-priced occasional use tools. KMS is a Canadian retailer of power , automotive , woodworking, welding, metalworking tools with construction equipment and car parts . It was founded in Coquitlam, BC in 1983 by Stan Pridham. It continues to be 100% Canadian and BC owned and operated by Stan Pridham who lives in BC.

Overview

As of June 2022, KMS Tools operates 15 stores across Western Canada. The company offices and distribution warehouse are both located in Coquitlam with the main store, car parts and the service department. In 2016 KMS Tools launched a series of new stationary woodworking tools under their house brand Magnum Industrial. These replaced the older "green" General International tools from Taiwan they had carried since they acquired House of Tools. They mail out a new 48 page catalog to all its club members every month. In 2020 they opened a web fulfilment centre in Abbotsford BC to support the growing trend of customers buying online from their website.

History

KMS Tools follows a retail store format with an industrial sales staff for education and larger accounts. Because of its large automotive enthusiast customer base, KMS Tools has also run a Show & Shine out of its Coquitlam location since 1995.

In 2009, KMS Tools took over the BC operations of the bankrupt former House of Tools. In addition to gaining a store in Langley, KMS Tools opened its first stores on Vancouver Island.

Notable top specialty brands supplied

SawStop Table Saws
Festool German engineered portable power tools
Kreg Wood joining tools
Hypertherm Plasma Cutters
Miller Welding Equipment
Magnum Industrial

Stores

As of September 2021, KMS has stores in the following locations (in order of date established):

British Columbia

Coquitlam
Abbotsford
Kamloops
Kelowna
Coquitlam Car Parts
Coquitlam Service Department
Victoria
Langley
Chilliwack
Prince George
Nanaimo

Alberta

Red Deer
Edmonton
Calgary
Grande Prairie
Edmonton South
Edmonton West

References
Download KMS Tools

Retail companies established in 1983
Hardware stores of Canada
Industrial supply companies
Privately held companies of Canada
Companies based in Coquitlam